Orectochilus is a genus of beetle native to the Palearctic (including Europe), the Near East and North Africa. It contains the following species:

 Orectochilus acuductus Régimbart, 1907
 Orectochilus acutilobus Régimbart, 1907
 Orectochilus aeneipennis Régimbart, 1907
 Orectochilus afghanus Ochs, 1955
 Orectochilus africanus Ochs, 1923
 Orectochilus agilis Sharp, 1884
 Orectochilus agnatus Ochs, 1937
 Orectochilus ahlwarthi Ochs, 1957
 Orectochilus alienus Ochs, 1933
 Orectochilus andamanicus Régimbart, 1884
 Orectochilus angulatus Régimbart, 1882
 Orectochilus angusticinctus Régimbart, 1907
 Orectochilus annandalei Ochs, 1925
 Orectochilus apicalis Régimbart, 1891
 Orectochilus archipelagensis Ochs, 1953
 Orectochilus argenteolimbatus Peschet, 1923
 Orectochilus assequens Ochs, 1936
 Orectochilus assimilis Ochs, 1957
 Orectochilus baeri Régimbart, 1886
 Orectochilus bakeri Ochs, 1924
 Orectochilus bataviensis Régimbart, 1907
 Orectochilus bicolor Ochs, 1957
 Orectochilus biformis Ochs, 1937
 Orectochilus bipartitus Régimbart, 1882
 Orectochilus birmanicus Régimbart, 1891
 Orectochilus boettcheri Ochs, 1937
 Orectochilus brevidens Ochs, 1940
 Orectochilus brevitarsis Falkenström, 1934
 Orectochilus brincki Ochs, 1948
 Orectochilus caliginosus Régimbart, 1907
 Orectochilus cameroni Ochs, 1925
 Orectochilus cardiophorus Régimbart, 1888
 Orectochilus cardoni Régimbart, 1892
 Orectochilus castaneus Régimbart, 1907
 Orectochilus castetsi Régimbart, 1892
 Orectochilus cavernicola Ochs, 1925
 Orectochilus celebensis Régimbart, 1907
 Orectochilus chalceus Ochs, 1936
 Orectochilus chinensis Régimbart, 1892
 Orectochilus choprai Ochs, 1925
 Orectochilus coimbatorensis Ochs, 1925
 Orectochilus compressus Sturm, 1826
 Orectochilus conspicuus Régimbart, 1882
 Orectochilus coomani Peschet, 1925
 Orectochilus cordatus Régimbart, 1888
 Orectochilus corniger Zaitzev, 1910
 Orectochilus corporaali Peschet, 1922
 Orectochilus corpulentus Régimbart, 1884
 Orectochilus crassipes Régimbart, 1884
 Orectochilus cribratellus Régimbart, 1891
 Orectochilus cuneatus Régimbart, 1892
 Orectochilus cupreolus Régimbart, 1907
 Orectochilus cylindricus Régimbart, 1892
 Orectochilus dehiscens Régimbart, 1907
 Orectochilus depressiusculus Ochs, 1940
 Orectochilus desgodinsi Régimbart, 1886
 Orectochilus dilatatus Redtenbacher, 1868
 Orectochilus discifer Walker, 1859
 Orectochilus discus Aubé, 1838
 Orectochilus dispar Régimbart, 1907
 Orectochilus distinguendus Ochs, 1942
 Orectochilus divergens Régimbart, 1907
 Orectochilus drescheri Ochs, 1937
 Orectochilus dulitensis Ochs, 1928
 Orectochilus dulitensis Ochs, 1932
 Orectochilus eberti Ochs, 1966
 Orectochilus emmerichi Falkenström, 1936
 Orectochilus fairmairei Régimbart, 1884
 Orectochilus fallax Peschet, 1923
 Orectochilus feae Régimbart, 1888
 Orectochilus ferruginicollis Régimbart, 1907
 Orectochilus figuratus Régimbart, 1892
 Orectochilus fletcheri Ochs, 1925
 Orectochilus florensis Régimbart, 1892
 Orectochilus foersteri Ochs, 1957
 Orectochilus formosanus Takizawa, 1931
 Orectochilus fraternus Régimbart, 1884
 Orectochilus fruhstorferi Régimbart, 1907
 Orectochilus fusiformis Régimbart, 1892
 Orectochilus gangeticus Wiedemann, 1821
 Orectochilus gestroi Régimbart, 1882
 Orectochilus grandipes Ochs, 1936
 Orectochilus haemorrhous Régimbart, 1892
 Orectochilus helferi Ochs, 1940
 Orectochilus himalayensis Vazirani, 1984
 Orectochilus hirtellus Ochs, 1940
 Orectochilus horni Ochs, 1933
 Orectochilus indicus Régimbart, 1884
 Orectochilus indulans Severin, 1892
 Orectochilus jaechi Mazzoldi, 1998
 Orectochilus javanus Aubé, 1838
 Orectochilus jilanzhui Mazzoldi, 1998
 Orectochilus kempi Ochs, 1925
 Orectochilus kinabaluensis Ochs, 1937
 Orectochilus klapperichi Ochs, 1942
 Orectochilus klynstrai Ochs, 1927
 Orectochilus landaisi Régimbart, 1892
 Orectochilus laticinctus Régimbart, 1907
 Orectochilus latimanus Régimbart, 1907
 Orectochilus leucophthalmus Fröhlich
 Orectochilus limbatus Régimbart, 1884
 Orectochilus longulus Régimbart, 1907
 Orectochilus lucidus Régimbart, 1882
 Orectochilus lumbaris Ochs, 1940
 Orectochilus malaisei Ochs, 1940
 Orectochilus marginepennis Aubé, 1838
 Orectochilus matruelis Régimbart, 1907
 Orectochilus melli Ochs, 1925
 Orectochilus metallicus Régimbart, 1884
 Orectochilus mimicus Ochs, 1936
 Orectochilus minusculus Ochs, 1936
 Orectochilus mjobergi Ochs, 1928
 Orectochilus mjobergianus Falkenström, 1934
 Orectochilus murinus Régimbart, 1892
 Orectochilus murudensis Ochs, 1928
 Orectochilus musculus Ochs, 1940
 Orectochilus nathani Ochs, 1966
 Orectochilus neglectus Ochs, 1925
 Orectochilus nigricans Régimbart, 1892
 Orectochilus nigroaeneus Régimbart, 1907
 Orectochilus nipponensis Zaitzev, 1910
 Orectochilus nitens Peschet, 1923
 Orectochilus nuristanicus Ochs, 1955
 Orectochilus oberthueri Régimbart, 1884
 Orectochilus oblongiusculus Régimbart, 1886
 Orectochilus obscuriceps Régimbart, 1907
 Orectochilus obtusangulus Régimbart, 1907
 Orectochilus obtusipennis Régimbart, 1892
 Orectochilus orbisonorum
 Orectochilus orissaensis Vazirani, 1958
 Orectochilus ornaticollis (Dejean, 1866)
 Orectochilus oxygonus Régimbart, 1907
 Orectochilus palawanensis Régimbart, 1907
 Orectochilus palliatus Dejean, 1833
 Orectochilus panoembanganus Ochs, 1940
 Orectochilus patellimanus Régimbart, 1907
 Orectochilus pendleburyi Ochs, 1932
 Orectochilus pescheti Ochs, 1957
 Orectochilus pfisteri Ochs, 1927
 Orectochilus philippinarum White, 1847
 Orectochilus pilosellus Ochs, 1940
 Orectochilus planatus Ochs, 1937
 Orectochilus planiusculus Ochs, 1937
 Orectochilus procerus Régimbart, 1884
 Orectochilus productus Régimbart, 1884
 Orectochilus pubescens Régimbart, 1882
 Orectochilus pulchellus Régimbart, 1884
 Orectochilus punctilabris Régimbart, 1907
 Orectochilus punctipennis Sharp, 1884
 Orectochilus punctulatus Régimbart, 1886
 Orectochilus pusillus Régimbart, 1882
 Orectochilus regimbarti Sharp, 1884
 Orectochilus ribeiroi Vazirani, 1958
 Orectochilus ritsemae Régimbart, 1882
 Orectochilus rivularis Régimbart, 1884
 Orectochilus ruficaudatus Ochs, 1940
 Orectochilus samarensis Ochs, 1929
 Orectochilus scalaris Régimbart, 1880
 Orectochilus schillhammeri Mazzoldi, 1998
 Orectochilus schultzei Ochs, 1924
 Orectochilus sculpturatus Régimbart, 1884
 Orectochilus seminitens Ochs, 1937
 Orectochilus semivestitus Guérin-Meneville, 1840
 Orectochilus severini Régimbart, 1892
 Orectochilus similis Ochs, 1929
 Orectochilus sinhalensis Ochs, 1937
 Orectochilus spiniger Régimbart, 1880
 Orectochilus spinosus Zimmermann, 1917
 Orectochilus staudingeri Régimbart, 1907
 Orectochilus strandi Ochs, 1936
 Orectochilus striolifer Régimbart, 1907
 Orectochilus sublineatus Régimbart, 1892
 Orectochilus subsinuatus Ochs, 1928
 Orectochilus sulcipennis Régimbart, 1892
 Orectochilus sutteri Ochs, 1953
 Orectochilus teranishii Kamiya, 1933
 Orectochilus tibialis Ochs, 1940
 Orectochilus timorensis Régimbart, 1907
 Orectochilus tomentosus Régimbart, 1891
 Orectochilus tonkinensis Régimbart, 1892
 Orectochilus trianguliger Régimbart, 1888
 Orectochilus undulans Régimbart, 1892
 Orectochilus validus Régimbart, 1882
 Orectochilus velatus Ochs, 1940
 Orectochilus vestitus Sturm, 1843
 Orectochilus villosovittatus Régimbart, 1891
 Orectochilus villosus (Müller, 1776)
 Orectochilus vitalisi Peschet, 1923
 Orectochilus volubilis Ochs, 1929
 Orectochilus wangi Mazzoldi, 1998
 Orectochilus waterstradti Ochs, 1940
 Orectochilus wehnckei Régimbart, 1884
 Orectochilus wui Ochs, 1932
 Orectochilus yayeyamensis Satô, 1971
 Orectochilus zeravschanicus Glasunow, 1893

References

External links
Orectochilus at Fauna Europaea

Gyrinidae
Adephaga genera
Taxa named by Pierre François Marie Auguste Dejean